Sierra Leone National Premier League is a professional football league in Sierra Leone. It was founded in 1967. The league is sponsored by the Sierra Leone Commercial Bank, one of the major Sierra Leonean banks. East End Lions and Mighty Blackpool are the two biggest and most successful clubs. The National Premier League is controlled by the Sierra Leone Football Association. The season runs from March to July. 

The current champions of the premier league are East End Lions. They won the league unbeatable in 2019.

Fc Kallon's 7-0 win against Sierra Leone Police Fc on October 23rd 2021 is the biggest win in the history of the league.

Structure
Eighteen clubs compete in the league, playing each other twice, once at home and once away. At the end of the season the bottom three clubs are relegated to the Sierra Leone National First Division, the second highest football league in Sierra Leone. The champions qualify for the CAF Champions League, while the second place team or the winner of the Sierra Leonean FA Cup will qualify for the CAF Confederation Cup. If the winner of the Sierra Leonean FA Cup has already qualify for the CAF Champions League, the Confederations Cup spot will go to the second place team in the table.

Current teams 2019 season

Previous winners

1967–68 : Mighty Blackpool (Freetown)
1969–72 : Not Played
1973 : Ports Authority (Freetown)
1974 : Mighty Blackpool (Freetown)
1975–76 : Not Played
1977 : East End Lions (Freetown)
1978 : Mighty Blackpool (Freetown)
1979 : Mighty Blackpool (Freetown)
1980 : East End Lions (Freetown)
1981 : Real Republicans (Freetown)
1982 : Sierra Fisheries (Freetown)
1983 : Real Republicans (Freetown)
1984 : Real Republicans (Freetown)
1985 : East End Lions (Freetown)
1986 : Sierra Fisheries (Freetown)
1987 : Sierra Fisheries (Freetown)
1988 : Mighty Blackpool (Freetown)
1989 : Freetown United (Freetown)
1990 : Old Edwardians (Freetown)
1991 : Mighty Blackpool (Freetown)
1992 : East End Lions (Freetown)
1993 : East End Lions (Freetown)
1994 : East End Lions (Freetown)
1995 : Mighty Blackpool (Freetown)
1996 : Mighty Blackpool (Freetown)
1997 : East End Lions (Freetown)
1998 : Mighty Blackpool (Freetown)
1999 : East End Lions (Freetown)
1999–00 : Mighty Blackpool (Freetown)
2000–01 : Mighty Blackpool (Freetown)
2002–04 : Not Played
2005 : East End Lions (Freetown)
2005–06 : Kallon (Freetown)
2007–08 : Ports Authority (Freetown)
2008–09 : East End Lions (Freetown)
2009–10 : East End Lions (Freetown)
2010–11 : Ports Authority (Freetown)
2011–12 : Diamond Stars (Koidu)
2012–13 : Diamond Stars (Koidu)
2014 : Not Finished
2015–18 : Not Played
2019 : East End Lions 
2019-20: Abandoned
2021–22 : Bo Rangers (Bo)

Performance by club

Top scorers

References

External links
SOCCERWAY
League at FIFA
TheFarFoot Website
RSSSF competition history

Football leagues in Sierra Leone
Sierra Leone
Sierra Leone National Premier League